Tiago Filipe Alves Brito  (born 22 July 1991) is a Portuguese futsal player who plays as a winger for Braga/AAUM

Honours
Benfica
Campeonato Nacional: 2018–19
Taça da Liga: 2017–18, 2018–19, 2019–20
Portugal
UEFA Futsal Championship: 2018, 2022
FIFA Futsal World Cup: 2021
 Futsal Finalissima: 2022

Orders
  Commander of the Order of Prince Henry
  Commander of the Order of Merit

References

External links

1991 births
Living people
Sportspeople from Matosinhos
Futsal forwards
Portuguese men's futsal players
AR Freixieiro players
S.L. Benfica futsal players